LaJuan Ramsey (born March 19, 1984) is a former American football defensive tackle. He was drafted by the Philadelphia Eagles in the sixth round of the 2006 NFL Draft. He played college football at Southern California.

Ramsey has also been a member of the San Francisco 49ers, Indianapolis Colts, Tennessee Titans and St. Louis Rams.

College career
He played college football at the University of Southern California.  A four-year contributor at both defensive tackle and end for a USC football squad that compiled a 48-4 record and captured two NCAA Championships.  He earned All-Pac-10 honorable mention as a senior, replacing current Eagle Mike Patterson (his former roommate).  He started 11 games in 2005, posting 40 tackles, including 6.5 TFLs.

Professional career

Pre-draft
 (* represents USC Pro Day)

In 19 career games, Ramsey has accumulated 24 tackles and one interception while being on the roster for five teams since 2006.

Philadelphia Eagles
Ramsey was a sixth round draft pick of the Philadelphia Eagles in the 2006 NFL Draft and saw action in six games as a reserve defensive tackle. He had one interception in his rookie season, which was against Green Bay in which he snared a tipped pass from Brett Favre.

Ramsey appeared in nine games for the Eagles the following season in 2007, recording nine tackles. In 2007 he set career high by appearing in nine contests and recorded nine tackles and one quarterback hurry.  He was waived on June 13, 2008.

Indianapolis Colts
Ramsey was signed by the Indianapolis Colts on September 11, 2008.  He appeared in four games for the Colts, recording six tackles, before his release on October 14.

St. Louis Rams
Ramsey was claimed off waivers by the St. Louis Rams on September 6, 2009. He played 15 games for the Rams with five starts. He totaled 16 tackles, one sack and one forced fumble. He was waived on March 4, 2010.

Cooking career
After his playing career ended, Ramsey took up cooking at Morel's French Steakhouse & Bistro at The Grove in Los Angeles. He then participated in an episode of Chef Wanted with Anne Burrell, and was the winner of the episode after a strong dinner service. His reward for winning was being offered the job as the new executive chef at Christy Bono's restaurant, Christy's on Broadway. He ultimately declined the position.

External links
Indianapolis Colts bio
Tennessee Titans bio
USC Trojans bio

References

1984 births
Living people
Sportspeople from Anniston, Alabama
African-American players of American football
Players of American football from Alabama
Players of American football from Compton, California
American football defensive tackles
American football defensive ends
USC Trojans football players
Philadelphia Eagles players
San Francisco 49ers players
Indianapolis Colts players
Tennessee Titans players
St. Louis Rams players
Hartford Colonials players
21st-century African-American sportspeople
20th-century African-American people